John Caldwell (4 July 1849 – 7 March 1916) was a nineteenth-century farmer and timber man of northern Michigan, associated with Missaukee County, Michigan. He was employed for several years by the Mitchell Brothers Company, a land agent firm in several states, dealing with large tracts of timber for making lumber. He homesteaded 100 acres, and had a diversified system of farming that proved successful. He was associated with different agricultural societies, including the National Grange of the Order of Patrons of Husbandry.

He involved himself with community matters, and was at one time or another a highway commissioner, school superintendent, township clerk, township treasurer, justice of the peace, and township supervisor. He was the county treasurer of Missaukee County for four years, and their supervisor for ten years. He had close ties with Escanaba, Lake City, Cadillac and Manton, Michigan.

Caldwell was Republican member of the Michigan State House of Representatives for two terms, from 1897 through 1900. He represented the Wexford district, comprising the counties of Wexford, Missaukee and Clare. He was an authority on property tax assessment, especially for northern Michigan and the Upper Peninsula. He was involved with developing various laws for the state of Michigan. He was employed by the state of Michigan as a tax assessor for land and property taxation on sawmills in various counties, including Missaukee County in the Lower Peninsula and Delta County in the Upper Peninsula.

Early life

Caldwell's parents, John Caldwell Sr. and Jane (Thompson) Caldwell, immigrated from Ireland and arrived separately in the state of New York in the early part of the nineteenth century. They were married in 1840. John Caldwell was born at Ridgeway in Orleans County, New York, on July 4, 1849. He was initially given the name George Washington Caldwell, as he was born on the anniversary of national independence. A year later, his parents decided to change it to John Jr., after his father's name. He was the fifth in a family with eight boys and one girl; his naming was in contrast to the contemporary Irish tradition of the first-born son receiving the father's name (since this name change was an afterthought). He was the third surviving son, however, so inherited the name 'John' and suffix by default. The third and fourth sons of the family died before they were 10 years old.

Caldwell came with his parents to Litchfield Township, in Hillsdale County in 1856. He worked on his father's farm in the summertime; during the winter, he attended the local public school for children. While his older brothers, and his father, served in the Civil War, he was too young to enlist for its duration. When he was seventeen years old (in 1866 or 1867), he went to the woods of Tuscola County, in the thumb area of Michigan, for his first employment; this would last for about four years. It was the beginning of his timber career, and he began to learn the industry. In November 1869, he traveled to Missaukee county in northern Michigan, where he would be employed for years as a land agent for George A. Mitchell and the Mitchell Brothers Company, buying and selling timber lands for development in Michigan and New Mexico.

Mid life

He later purchased an adjacent  of land, and a nearby  parcel. These all contained old growth white pine timber, which was of considerable value for the development of Michigan. Much of it was used in the construction of Lake City, Manton, Cadillac and other northern Michigan towns. Caldwell, and his older brother Thomas (1843–1882), were among the first settlers in Missaukee County, and both were deeply involved in developing northern Michigan in the later part of the nineteenth century. The township of Caldwell, in Missaukee County, is named in honor of them. Thomas was the second son in the family, after James. Following the Irish naming practice, his middle name was Thompson (their mother's maiden name). Other Caldwell siblings were William, George, Charlie and Mary Jane.

Caldwell's father died in Big Rapids (in Mecosta County), in 1870, at the age of 65. His mother, Jane, died in Jonesville (in Hillsdale County) in 1886, also at the age of 65, as is revealed on her tombstone in the Jonesville cemetery. She was able to receive a Civil War pension due to her eldest son (Caldwell's brother) being killed in the Civil War, as well as her husband (Caldwell's father) having served in the Civil War. Caldwell married Martha E. Babcock of Missaukee County, on June 29, 1873.

Political career
In 1897, Caldwell was elected to the Michigan House of Representatives, on the Republican ticket, representing Wexford County, Missaukee County and Clare County. Two years later, he was reelected to the legislature. Caldwell received 3,173 votes, defeating the Democratic People's Union candidate Joseph Yarnell (who received 1,888 votes). Caldwell's personal Michigan legislative handbook shows the Representative members, and what districts they represented, in 1897.

The Escanaba Tribune reports in an article of June 1900:

The article further explains the authority he has from the state of Michigan:

Caldwell gave an assessment of Missaukee County in 1900 to the state of Michigan legislature, saying: "I think that Missaukee County is and has been valued higher than it should be, as compared to other counties. You are aware that this county's principal value has been in the pine timber which formed unbroken forests over the greater part of its area.

Caldwell took an interest in public matters, and served Caldwell Township as highway commissioner, township clerk, township treasurer, justice of the peace, and township supervisor. He was involved with the township's educational interests, and at times filled the school offices. Caldwell was the county treasurer of Missaukee County for four years, and supervisor for ten years. He was also involved with various laws in certain townships concerning hunting deer in Michigan.

Farming endeavors
Caldwell and his wife were members of Missaukee Grange #918, of the National Grange of the Order of Patrons of Husbandry. He was also the Master of Pomona Grange #56 of Missaukee County in 1903, when it was organized. He later added an adjacent . From this, he cleared  of timber, after which the land was worked in an agriculture enterprise. Caldwell had a successful diversified system of farming, with multiple substantial buildings for his goods and commodities.

Retirement and death

Caldwell retired in 1909, and lived the last seven years of his life in Manton. He built a house 2 blocks east of downtown Manton at 206 Main Street, which still exists over a hundred years later. His daughter Leona, and her husband, took over the ownership of his homestead in Missaukee County, which they continued to farm for many years. Caldwell was president of the village of Manton for one term. He often took walks downtown to associate with the locals during his retirement. He died 7 March 1916, at his home, and is buried at the Caldwell cemetery.

Footnotes

Endnotes

Sources

External links

1849 births
1916 deaths
People from Ridgeway, New York
Republican Party members of the Michigan House of Representatives
19th-century American politicians
People from Litchfield, Michigan
People from Wexford County, Michigan